The Leon Baronetcy, of Bletchley Park in Bletchley in the County of Buckingham, is a title in the Baronetage of the United Kingdom. It was created on 5 July 1911 for Herbert Leon, a financier and Liberal Member of Parliament for Buckinghamshire North from 1891 to 1895. The third Baronet was married to the actress Kay Hammond. Their son, the fourth Baronet, is the actor John Standing.

The Leon family owned Bletchley Park in Buckinghamshire between 1883 and 1937. It was then used as a codebreaking establishment during the Second World War.

Leon baronets, of Bletchley Park (1911—)

  Sir Herbert Samuel Leon, 1st Baronet (1850—1926)
  Sir George Edward Leon, 2nd Baronet (1875—1947)
  Sir Ronald George Leon, 3rd Baronet (1902—1964)
  Sir John Ronald Leon, 4th Baronet (1934—) (known as the actor John Standing)
 (1) Alexander John Leon (1965—)
 (2) Thomas Alexander Melford Leon (1998—)
 (3) William Edward John Leon (2001—)
 (4) Archie Leon (1986—)
 (5) Timothy Michael George Leon (1938—)
 Reginald Herbert Leon (1882—1960)
 Herbert Geoffrey Leon (1907—1911)
 Richard Neville Leon (1909—1981)
 (6) David Richard Leon (1946—)
 (7) Daniel James Leon (1976—)
 Derek Noel Leon (1912—1938)

The heir apparent is the present holder's son, Alexander John Leon (born 1965).

The heir apparent's heir apparent is the present holder's grandson, Thomas Alexander Melford Leon (born 1998).

Arms

Notes

References
Kidd, Charles, Williamson, David (editors). Debrett's Peerage and Baronetage (1990 edition). New York: St Martin's Press, 1990, 

Leon